Euthychaeta is a genus of flies in the Diastatidae family.

Species
E. spectabilis (Loew, 1864)

References

Diastatidae
Ephydroidea genera